The Saarland Cup (German: Saarlandpokal) is one of the 21 regional cup competitions of German football. The winner of the competition gains entry to the first round of the German Cup. It is limited to clubs from Saarland, however, teams from the Bundesliga and 2. Bundesliga are not permitted to compete.

A number of clubs from regions of Rhineland-Palatinate who border the Saarland also compete in the Cup, best known of these being the SV Hasborn who has won the cup twice.

History
The Cup was established in 1974. The Saarland Cup is played annually. Previous to the Saarpokal, a South West German Cup, not to be confused with the South West Cup, was played from 1964 to 1974. It was also a qualifying competition for the German Cup but included clubs from both the Saarland and Rhineland-Palatinate.

The winner of the Saarland Cup qualified for the first round of the German Cup.

Since the establishment of the 3rd Liga in 2008, reserve teams can not take part in the German Cup anymore, but are permitted to play in the regional competitions.

Modus
Clubs from fully professional leagues are not permitted to enter the competition, meaning, no teams from the Bundesliga and the 2. Bundesliga can compete.

All clubs from the Saarland playing in the 3. Liga (III), Regionalliga West (IV), Oberliga Südwest (V), Verbandsliga Saarland (VI) and the two Landesligas (VII) gain direct entry to the first round. All clubs below that level play two preliminary rounds in four regional groups. The lower classed team always receives home advantage, except in the final, which is played on neutral ground.

Cup finals
Held annually at the end of season, these were the cup finals since 1975:

 Winners in bold

Winners
Listed in order of wins, the Cup winners are:

 1 Includes one win by reserve team, 1. FC Saarbrücken II.

References

Sources
Deutschlands Fußball in Zahlen,  An annual publication with tables and results from the Bundesliga to Verbandsliga/Landesliga, publisher: DSFS

External links
Saarland Football Association website 
Fussball.de: Saarland Cup 

Recurring sporting events established in 1974
Football cup competitions in Germany
Football competitions in Saarland
1974 establishments in West Germany